, is an anime film based on Chitose Kobayashi's autobiographical novel of the same name, produced on the occasion of the 30th anniversary of the Japanese Movie Center.

It narrates the vicissitudes suffered by the Kobayashi family after the armed conflict of the World War II, focused according to Chitose's vision at the time.

It was produced by TV Tokyo, animated by Madhouse and directed by Toshio Hirata; its premiere in Japan was on July 10, 1993.

Plot 
Chitose Kobayashi, a seven-year-old Japanese girl, raised in the Sinuiju of Korea occupied by Japan during World War II, completely ignored what it meant to be at war, but unfortunately she soon discovered that it affected the soldiers so much that they fight on the mountain front like the civilians living far away from the battlefield.

World War II begins for her the day her father receives a letter that forced him to enlist in the army and leave for the front.

Subsequently, a series of devastating events that mark her childhood occur. Miko, Chitose's younger sister, dies of typhoid; Ohana, her Korean servant girl and friend, is fired after committing imprudence; and Japan surrenders to the Allies.

Upon returning from her father, already in times of peace, the Russians invaded North Korea and the whole family was forced to leave that country. After unearthing the ashes of Miko, they must board a train that will take them further south of the 38th parallel, where the Americans are. However, they are forced to abandon it halfway to escape an inspection of the North Koreans. Another of the setbacks with which they have to face is the disorientation to walk on unknown roads, which causes them to move in circles throughout the day, but manage to follow the map drawn by the stars in the sky. As they progress, the difficulties will increase until they reach an emotional outcome.

Analysis 
Japan has long faced issues when it comes to acknowledging its actions in World War II. This conflict between war memory and reality is most noticeably seen when it comes to their occupation of Korea. Japan formally annexed Korea in 1910 after fighting two wars over the peninsula. Soon after annexation, Japan instituted policies that made it illegal to teach the Korean language or history and forced Koreans to change their names to Japanese ones. This is seen in Rail of the Star when Chitose meets a young Korean boy who has become resentful of the Japanese occupiers, but this interaction favors the Japanese by painting the young boy’s feelings as outlandish and highlighting how scared his plans made Chitose. Rail of the Star also jumps over any mention of ‘Comfort Women’, even though the vast majority of these comfort women were Korean. This indirect denial of history is not that unique when it comes to Japanese manga, as many popular animes have struggled to come to terms with Japan’s actions during the war. Just like Rail of the Star, many animes will have an anti-war undertone but will separate the realities of war from Japanese responsibility. Through retelling her experience during the war, Chitose makes a strong argument against war, but chooses to keep these anti-war sentiments more abstract as opposed to placing blame. Japanese anime and other forms of media also suffer from the concept of the Japanese being the true victims of the war. Although Chitose and her family belong to the aggressor nation, they are victimized by the film’s focus on their escape from Korea. This “self-victimization” is also seen in conflicts that have arisen over how Japanese textbooks should deal with the war. Japanese conservatives have often challenged any textbook that was critical of the Japanese empire as being “anti-Japanese” and have put forth their own textbooks, like the one created by the Japanese Society for History Textbook Reform, that ignore any Japanese wrongdoing and focus on the damage done to Japan during and after the war. In the end, Rail of the Star falls flat when it comes to its retelling of ‘history’. While one does feel sorry for Chitose and her family, one cannot ignore the reality that they were the occupiers in Korea and citizens of a nation that committed war atrocities like the Rape of Nanking and the use of Comfort Women.

Voice cast 
 Yoshino Takamori as Chitose Kobayashi (Chiko)
 Hideyuki Tanaka as Kazuhiko Kobayashi
 Keiko Han as Masuko Kobayashi
 Kenichi Ogata as Takeshi
 Chika Sakamoto as Michiyo Kobayashi (Miko)
 Reiko Suzuki as Shigeko
 Tomoko Maruo as Ohana
 Shinpachi Tsuji as Sano
 Hideyuki Umezu as Takayashi
 Chafurin as Village Chief
 Yuka Ohno as Yohko
 Issei Miyazaki as Yong-Il
 Michiko Neya as Hatsue
 Junji Kitajima as Guide
 Koji Ishii as Interpreter
 Eiji Itô as Station Staff
 Yuuko Sumitomo as Yukiko
 Nariatsu Nomura as Officer

References

External links 
 

1993 films
1993 anime films
Japanese animated films
1990s Japanese-language films
Madhouse (company)
Films set in North Korea